Golden Bears may refer to:

 Alberta Golden Bears
 California Golden Bears
 Kutztown Golden Bears